Moema is a district in the south region of the city of São Paulo.

Toponym 
The toponym "Moema" is a reference to the character, possibly fictional, of the poem Caramuru, by Santa Rita Durão, classic of the Brazilian arcade literature written in 1781. The character's name, in turn, corresponds to the Old Tupi language mo'ema, which means "lie" (in the poem, Moema was the lover rejected by the main character, Diogo Álvares, thus representing false love, as opposed to true love, represented by Diogo's wife, Catarina Paraguaçu).

History

Bordering districts

Nearby Districts

Characteristics

References 

Districts of São Paulo